Hulmeville Historic District is a national historic district located in Hulmeville, Bucks County, Pennsylvania.  The district includes 103 contributing buildings, 3 contributing structures, and 1 contributing object in the borough of Hulmeville. They include a variety of residential, commercial, and institutional buildings, some of which are representative of the vernacular Greek Revival, Federal, and Late Victorian styles.  Notable buildings include the John Pryor / John Hulme House (c. 1794), Edward Hicks House (c. 1808), Johnson's Hall (1871), Hulmeville Borough Hall (1894), Silas Barkley Mill (1880), and the Episcopal church (1851).

It was added to the National Register of Historic Places in 1986.

References
 

Historic districts in Bucks County, Pennsylvania
Federal architecture in Pennsylvania
Greek Revival architecture in Pennsylvania
Victorian architecture in Pennsylvania
Historic districts on the National Register of Historic Places in Pennsylvania
National Register of Historic Places in Bucks County, Pennsylvania